Abu al-Hakam al-Kirmani (died 1066 CE) was a prominent philosopher and scholar from the Muslim al-Andalus. A student of Maslamah Ibn Ahmad al-Majriti, he was a Neoplatonic advocate, and seen as an influence on Ibn 'Arabi, but he also wrote extensively on geometry and logic. His exact date of death is not known as he fled to Morocco in the twelfth century. It is possible that it was he who returned to al-Andalus with the Epistles of the Brethren of Purity.

References

Islamic philosophers
Physicians from al-Andalus
11th-century philosophers
Year of birth missing
People from Córdoba, Spain
11th-century people from al-Andalus
1066 deaths
Philosophers from al-Andalus